Cadrema or Kadrema was a town of ancient Lycia, a colony of Olbia.
The name is supposed to derive from “the parching of corn” (Κάδρεμα).

References

Populated places in ancient Lycia
Former populated places in Turkey
Greek colonies in Anatolia